Welthon Fiel Sampaio (born 21 June 1992) is a Brazilian footballer who plays for Remo.

Club career
Born in Belém, Welthon played once in the Campeonato Paraense for hometown club Tuna Luso in 2010 before moving to Atlético Goianense. Though he never took to the pitch in the Campeonato Brasileiro Série A for the team, he played twice in their Campeonato Goiano win in 2011.

In November 2012, Welthon moved to Grêmio Anápolis in the same state. The following July, he was loaned to S.C. Braga, a Portuguese club partnered with his employer. His loan at the reserve team from the Segunda Liga ended in January 2014.

In June 2016, Welthon returned to Portugal with Primeira Liga club F.C. Paços de Ferreira. He finished his first season in the top flight with 11 goals, joint-seventh best in the league; this included braces in home and away wins over Vitória de Setúbal. He was also top scorer of the season's Taça da Liga with four, in braces against C.D. Nacional and F.C. Vizela.

On 23 January 2018, Welthon transferred to neighbours Vitória de Guimarães on a four-year deal, with a release clause of €30 million. After six goalless games, his season ended with three matches to go due to a left thigh injury in training. He scored his only goal for the team on 5 March 2019, the sole one of a home win over C.S. Marítimo.

On 2 September 2019, Welthon returned to Paços on a season-long loan, after Ivo Vieira demoted him to Vitória's reserves. In November, he suffered a right knee injury in a win over C.D. Tondela, and played only once again thereafter.

Welthon was named as a surplus player on Vitória's squad for 2020–21. He made a substitute appearance for the B-team in the third tier on 14 February 2021, his first game in 13 months.

References

External links
Soccerway profile
ForaDeJogo profile

Brazilian footballers
1992 births
Living people
Sportspeople from Belém
Primeira Liga players
Campeonato de Portugal (league) players
Tuna Luso Brasileira players
Atlético Clube Goianiense players
S.C. Braga B players
Clube do Remo players
F.C. Paços de Ferreira players
Vitória S.C. players
Vitória S.C. B players
Brazilian expatriate footballers
Brazilian expatriate sportspeople in Portugal
Expatriate footballers in Portugal
Association football forwards